Robert "Rob" Farris-Olsen is an American attorney and politician serving as a member of the Montana House of Representatives from the 79th district. Elected in 2018, he assumed office on January 7, 2019.

Early life and education 
Farris-Olsen was born and raised in Helena, Montana and graduated from Helena High School. He earned a Bachelor of Arts degree in environmental studies from Whitman College and a Juris Doctor from the Alexander Blewett III School of Law at the University of Montana.

Career 
Farris-Olsen completed a clerkship program with Judge Mike Wheat of the Montana Supreme Court. He then entered private practice, and has specialized in consumer protection law. In 2015, he was elected to the Helena City Commission. In 2018, he was elected to the Montana House of Representatives, representing the 79th district.

References 

Living people
People from Helena, Montana
Whitman College alumni
University of Montana alumni
Montana lawyers
Democratic Party members of the Montana House of Representatives
Year of birth missing (living people)